Sewn Mouth Secrets is the second full-length album from Louisiana-based heavy metal band Soilent Green. It was released on September 22, 1998.

History 
Sewn Mouth Secrets was Soilent Green's first full-length album to be released on Relapse Records. They had already worked with the label for their previous EP A String of Lies. It was recorded in 1998, on May 22 through June 1; it was produced by Keith Falgout and Soilent Green. It was mixed during the June 20 and 21 of the same year at Festival Studios by Keith Falgout and the band. It was mastered by Dave Shirk at Sonorous Mastering, Inc., in Tempe, Arizona. The album was finally released on September 22, 1998. Scott Hull  remastered the album at Visceral Sound for a compilation with the EP A String of Lies which was released on October 11, 2005.

The album was generally well received. It was given a 4.5 out of 5 by William York of AllMusic, who called it "the band's strongest effort to date." It made Rolling Stone call Soilent Green one of the "ten most important hard and heavy bands right now" and was 18th on Terrorizers top albums of 1998.

Music and artwork 
The record features Soilent Green's mixture of grindcore and sludge metal. According to William York from AllMusic, "each song is a nonstop sequence of constantly morphing riffs and assaultive, split-personality vocals, leaving listeners little chance to catch their breaths." Throughout, frontman Ben Falgoust alternates between black metal screams; a hardcore-derived, semi-barking voice; spoken word passages; and death growls. According to York, "his varied vocals, together with his sadistic lyrics, make for a frightening and intense presence."  During the album the band uses Southern-flavored rock grooves, blast beats, moments very complex musically and Black Sabbath-inspired riffs. There are a few quiet moments, like the intros on "Build Fear" and "Her Unsober Ways."

Although not credited, Phil Anselmo provided backing vocals on the album. He is given thanks in the liner notes.

The cover of the album is based on a picture by Alfons Mucha.

Track listing 
All songs by Soilent Green.
 "It Was Just an Accident" – 4:12
 "So Hatred" – 3:48
 "Build Fear" – 2:48
 "Looking Through Nails" – 3:03
 "Breed in Weakness" – 4:13
 "Cold-Steel Kiss" – 3:37
 "Openless" – 0:26
 "Her Unsober Ways" – 4:03
 "Sewn Mouth Secrets" – 5:24
 "Walk a Year in My Mind" – 5:10
 "Gagged Whore" – 4:23
 "Emptiness Found" – 3:42
 "Sticks and Stones" – 0:53

Personnel 
Louis Benjamin Falgoust II – vocals
Brian Patton – lead guitar
Donovan Punch – rhythm guitar
Scott Williams – bass
Tommy Buckley – drums
Phil Anselmo – backing vocals (uncredited)
Keith Falgout – producer, mixer
Dave Shirk – mastering

Notes

References 

Soilent Green albums
1998 albums
Relapse Records albums